Summerfolk is an annual folk music and craft festival held in Owen Sound, Ontario during the third weekend in August (August 20–23 in 2015). Summerfolk attracts performers and fans from across North America and the globe to Kelso Beach Park located on the west shore of Owen Sound on Georgian Bay. The festival was founded in 1976 by brothers Tim and John Harrison and is nationally renowned for its music and craft excellence. The festival was also a founding member of the Ontario Council of Folk Festivals, known as Folk Music Ontario.

Summerfolk has featured folk musicians from across Canada and around the world. Artists from Mongolia to Mozambique, Chile to China, and Georgian Bay to the Georgia Strait have performed at Summerfolk. Summerfolk is known for its blending of contemporary artists with traditional folk musicians. The festival began very modestly with audiences sitting on garbage bags in a muddy field in 1976, but over time has grown to a four-day festival with seven musical stages and an Artisan’s Village where dozens of vendors sell handcrafted wares. The festival hosts thousands of attendees yearly and hundreds of volunteers work to provide services throughout the weekend. Thanks to partnerships between the City of Owen Sound and the Georgian Bay Folk Society, Kelso Beach now welcomes crowds to a limestone amphitheatre with seats for 3000  people and a covered stage dedicated to the memory of Stan Rogers; one of Summerfolk’s original performers and largest supporters. Construction and improvements to the site have changed much of the look but the original spirit and goal of the festival have not changed. In 2010 the festival saw 12,000 people attend over the three days.

Summerfolk experienced heavy rain during 20 of its first 30 years. Long-time festival-goers sometimes refer to it affectionately as 'Summersoak". In August 2011 the festival experienced extremely inclement weather with heavy downpours and thundershowers. Attendance plummeted and The Folk Society found themselves $25,000 in debt when the festival was over. An appeal to the community and many of its far-flung supporters was able to turn this situation around by October of that year and Summerfolk 2012 ran as usual. During years when lightning forces the sound crews to shut down the PA systems and wait for the thunder to subside, performers have been known to move into the centres of tents and stages, inviting the audience in out of the rain for intimate acoustic performances and sing-a-longs. At one particularly memorable workshop in 2011, Ken Whitely, Kildear, and the Good Lovelies invited the audience to come in under the cover of the Gazebo Stage while rain pelted their backs and umbrellas. The workshop ended with Ken Whitely leading the crowd in swelling harmonies on “This Little Light of Mine”. 

Since 2007, Summerfolk has reserved performance spaces for young performers through the Young Discoveries Showcase offering winners a chance to play at the festival. The contest is open to performers under the age of 21 and features two rounds of judged performances.

Many performers who have played at Summerfolk have gone on to great commercial success, such as Leahy, Valdy, The Rankins, The Arrogant Worms, and Natalie MacMaster. Other more commercial Canadian talent have also graced the stages over the years such as  Gowan, Rik Emmett, Blue Rodeo,  Moxy Früvous, and Bruce Cockburn. One of Summerfolk's most famous and revered performers was Stan Rogers whose family remains a large contributor to the festival. A monument to Stan Rogers was erected in his memory.

2022 marks Summerfolk's 46th year of operation for the festival.

References

External links
Official website

Folk festivals in Canada
Music festivals in Ontario
Owen Sound
Tourist attractions in Grey County
Music festivals established in 1975